Stephen Henry (Steve) Bastable (born 16 September 1956 Birmingham, England) is a former Speedway rider, son of Harry Bastable, who had also been a rider. Like his father, he spent the majority of his career with the Cradley Heathens but in three years with the Coventry Bees he scored almost one thousand points.

He won the British Speedway Championship in 1981.

World Final Appearances
 1978 -  London, Wembley Stadium - Reserve - did not ride

References

1956 births
Living people
British speedway riders
English motorcycle racers
British Speedway Championship winners
Coventry Bees riders
Birmingham Brummies riders
Stoke Potters riders
Cradley Heathens riders
Bradford Dukes riders